The Blohm & Voss P 200 was a design project for a transatlantic transport flying boat during World War II. It was intended to go into production for Deutsche Lufthansa after the war.

History

During the early stages of World War II, when it was going well for Germany, the airline Deutsche Lufthansa raised a requirement for a postwar transatlantic flying boat with a capacity of 100 passengers. Blohm & Voss gave the design work to their Head of Preliminary Design, Hans Amtmann, who had the necessary experience.

Design

Structurally, the P 200 was a scaled-up BV 222 Wiking. It was bigger even than the BV 238, and only the Hughes H-4 Hercules has ever been bigger.

Its hull accommodated three deck levels, providing luxury facilities for 120 passengers, with additional freight holds fore and aft.

The wing used Chief Designer Richard Vogt's standard technique of a tubular steel wing spar which also functioned as the main fuel tankage. Its section was thick enough for engineers to go along inside the wings and attend to the engines in flight.

The P 200 was to be powered by eight BMW 803 series twin-radial engines, each driving a contra-rotating propeller and delivering .

BV 726 jet derivative 

The BV 726 was a jet-powered development of the P 200, its 700 series number indicating that construction would not begin until some time after the war was over.

Specification

See also
Blohm & Voss BV 222
Blohm & Voss BV 238

References

Notes

Bibliography
Cowin, Hugh W.; “Blohm und Voss Projects of World War II,” Part III,  Air Pictorial, December 1963, pp. 404-405.
Pohlmann, Hermann. 'Chronik Eines Flugzeugwerkes 1932-1945 (German), 2nd impression, Motorbuch, 1982 (1st edn. 1979), pp. 180-181. .

P 200